Spider is an illustrated literary magazine designed for children from 6 to 9 years old. Started in January 1994, the magazine is published in the United States by The Cricket Magazine Group, which is owned by the Carus Publishing Company. The headquarters of the magazine is in Chicago, Illinois.

Internet
Since June 2008, Cricket, Spider, and Ladybug magazines have had websites for their child readers and families.

Awards
The magazine was a 2007 and 2008 winner of a Gold Parents' Choice Award for excellence in children's publishing.

References

External links
Official Site
Cricket Magazine Group

1994 establishments in Illinois
Children's magazines published in the United States
Magazines established in 1994
Magazines published in Chicago
Monthly magazines published in the United States